Strother may refer to:

Surnames
Ann Strother (born 1983), American basketball coach and former player
Cynthia and Kay Strother, singing siblings known as the Bell Sisters
Dean C. Strother (1908–2000), U.S. Air Force four-star general and commander-in-chief of NORAD
David Hunter Strother (1816–1888), American magazine illustrator and writer
Deon Strother (born 1972), American football player
Dora Dougherty Strother (1921–2013), World War II pilot
Emily Vielé Strother (born 1866), American writer
George Strother (1783–1840), American politician and lawyer
James F. Strother (1811–1860), American politician and lawyer, son of George Strother
James F. Strother (West Virginia politician) (1868–1930), lawyer, judge, and U. S. Representative from West Virginia, grandson of James F. Strother
Percy Strother (1946–2005), American electric blues guitarist, singer and songwriter
Raymond Strother, American political consultant

Given names
Strother Martin (1919–1980), American actor
Strother M. Stockslager (1842–1930), U.S. Representative from Indiana
J Strother Moore, American computer scientist

Places
Strother, Missouri, an unincorporated community
Town of Strother, original name of Lee's Summit, Missouri, a city
Fort Strother, a stockade fort built in 1813 in the Mississippi Territory
Strother Army Airfield, a World War II training base in Kansas
Strother Creek, in Missouri
Strother Field, a public airport that was formerly Strother Army Airfield

See also
Strothers, a surname
Struthers (disambiguation)